Baldy Mountain (official name),  Baldy Peak, Mount Baldy, or Old Baldy is the highest peak in the Cimarron Range, a subrange of the Sangre de Cristo Mountains of New Mexico.

Philmont Scout Ranch
Baldy Mountain lies on the northwestern border of the Boy Scouts of America's Philmont Scout Ranch. The valleys on the eastern side of the peak are home to some of the many small camps that are scattered throughout the Ranch. Four wheel drive roads and a radio tower exist high on the western slopes. In 1963 Norton Clapp bought  around the mountain and donated it to the Boy Scouts of America.

Mining
Copper, gold, and silver were mined in the Baldy Mining District starting in 1866, and the top of Baldy Mountain was developed as the Mystic Lode copper mine. Other mines near Baldy Mountain were the Aztec, French Henry mine, Bull-of-the-Woods, Homestake, Black Horse, and Montezuma mines. Mine workings and prospects are still evident on the slopes of the mountain as well.

Gallery

See also
Tooth of Time
Mount Phillips (New Mexico)
List of peaks named Baldy
Cimarron Range
Culebra Range
4000 meter peaks of the United States
Geography and ecology of Philmont Scout Ranch

External links

References

Baldy Mountain
Sangre de Cristo Mountains
Landforms of Colfax County, New Mexico
Philmont Scout Ranch
Mountains of Colfax County, New Mexico